Gantenerumab is a monoclonal antibody for the treatment of Alzheimer's disease being developed by Hoffmann-La Roche pharmaceuticals.

Gantenerumab binds to and clears aggregated beta amyloid fibers.

A phase III clinical trial of gantenerumab was stopped early because of a lack efficacy. Gantenerumab is also being evaluated in younger patients at high risk of developing Alzheimer's disease but after five years of treatment, the drug did little to slow cognitive decline in patients.

References 

Monoclonal antibodies